Music Wonderland is a compilation album by Mike Oldfield released in 1981 on Virgin Records. The album has since been reissued worldwide on CD.

Another compilation released the previous year, Mike Oldfield's Wonderland,  has not been reissued since; this is considered its reissue, although it has a different track listing.

Track listing

Side one
 "Arrival" – 2:48
 "Portsmouth" – 2:02
 "Sheba" – 3:34
 "Blue Peter" – 2:08
 "Tubular Bells" (extract from part one) – 8:32
 "The Sailor's Hornpipe" – 1:34
 "Punkadiddle" (edit with no intro) – 4:58

Side two
 "Wonderful Land" – 3:39
 "In Dulci Jubilo" – 2:50
 "Ommadawn" (extract from part one) – 7:06
 "On Horseback" – 3:25
 "Guilty" (live-edit) – 3:41
 "North Star / Platinum Finale" – 4:44

Charts

Weekly charts

Year-end charts

Certifications

References

Mike Oldfield compilation albums
1981 compilation albums